Warner Batchelor (15 October 1934 – 11 February 2016) was an Australian boxer. He competed in the men's flyweight event at the 1956 Summer Olympics. In his first fight, he defeated Henryk Kukier of Poland, before losing to John Caldwell of Ireland in his next bout.

References

1934 births
2016 deaths
Australian male boxers
Olympic boxers of Australia
Boxers at the 1956 Summer Olympics
Boxers from Brisbane
Commonwealth Games medallists in boxing
Commonwealth Games bronze medallists for Australia
Boxers at the 1954 British Empire and Commonwealth Games
Flyweight boxers
Medallists at the 1954 British Empire and Commonwealth Games